Maria Angelina Doukaina Palaiologina or Marija Angelina Nemanjić or Anna Maria Angelina Doukaina Palaiologina (1349 – 28 December 1394) was a Byzantine Greek-Serbian aristocrat and the self-proclaimed basilissa (Greek: βασίλισσα; Empress, queen) of Epirus from 1384–85, succeeding the rule of her murdered husband Thomas Preljubović. Maria and her husband were a famed couple as patrons of the arts during Tomo's rule of Ioannina from 1366 to 1384. She is portrayed in the icons.

Life 
Maria was the daughter of the Serbian Emperor of Thessaly, Simeon Uroš, the half-brother of Emperor Stephen Uroš IV Dušan of Serbia (Nemanjić dynasty), and Thomais Orsini. Her maternal grandfather was John Orsini of Epirus. In 1361, Maria, then only 12 years old, married Thomas Preljubović, who was appointed the governor (despot) of Epirus in Ioannina by her father in 1366. Popular with her subjects, she was allegedly mistreated by her husband and supposedly connived in his murder on 23 December 1384.

The population of Ioannina acclaimed Maria as ruler. She used the title of basilissa, female form of basileus. She summoned her brother John Uroš Doukas Palaiologos (who became a monk in Meteora monastery by the name of Joasaph) to advise her in the affairs of state, though he didn't stay long.

John Uroš suggested that Maria marry Esau de' Buondelmonti, one of the Latin noblemen captured by Thomas in 1379. It has been alleged that Maria was already enamored of the captive before the murder of her husband, and that this affair had resulted in the assassination of Thomas. Of course, all of this is pure conjecture.

Maria married Esau ("who sought recognition from Byzantium") in February 1385. Maria survived for a further decade, dying on 28 December 1394. She was 55.

Upon Esau's assumption of power, John Uroš left for Meteora where he was tonsured and took the name of Joasaph. He died in 1422.

The Chronicle of Ioannina, so hostile towards Thomas Preljubović, describes Maria in very flattering terms; the Byzantine historian Laonikos Chalkokondyles, however, describes her as an unfaithful wife of questionable morality. Both accounts may be biased. Maria does not appear to have had surviving children from either marriage.

See also 
 :Category:Byzantine Empresses regnant

References

Sources

 
 
 
 
 

14th-century despots of Epirus
14th-century women rulers
14th-century Serbian royalty
Medieval rulers of Epirus
Consorts of Epirus
Nemanjić dynasty
Medieval Serbian princesses
1394 deaths
Year of birth uncertain
People of Byzantine descent
14th-century rulers in Europe
Medieval Ioannina
Empresses regnant